This is a list of musicians who are operatic pop artists.

Operatic pop or popera is a subgenre of pop music that is performed in an operatic singing style or a song, theme or motif from classical music stylized as pop.

Operatic pop solo singers
Notable operatic pop solo singers include:

 Aled Jones
 Alessandro Safina
 Alfie Boe
 Amaury Vassili
 Andrea Bocelli
 Camilla Kerslake
 Charlotte Church
 Chris Mann
 Emma Shapplin
 Faryl Smith
 Fernando Lima
 Fernando Varela
 Filippa Giordano
 Garðar Thór Cortes
 Giorgia Fumanti
 Grace Bawden
 Hayley Westenra
 Hollie Steel
 Isabel Suckling
 Izzy
 Jackie Evancho
 Joe McElderry
 Jonathan Ansell
 Jonathan Antoine
 Josh Groban
 Katherine Jenkins
 Keedie
 Margaret Keys
 Mario Frangoulis
 Mark Masri
 Mary-Jess Leaverland
 Natasha Marsh
 Patrizia
 Paul Potts
 Rebecca Newman
 Rhydian Roberts
 Russell Watson
 Sarah Brightman
 Sasha Lazard
 Siobhan Owen
 Sissel
 Tayla Alexander
 Vittorio Grigolo
 Will Martin

Operatic pop groups
Notable operatic pop groups include:

 All Angels
 Amici Forever
 Blake
 Celtic Woman
 Forte Tenors
 G4
 Il Divo
 Il Volo
 Jonathan and Charlotte
 Only Men Aloud!
 Opera Babes
 RyanDan
 The Tenors

See also

 Rock opera (and Category)
 Crossover music
 List of classical and art music traditions
 Lists of singers
 Lists of musicians

References

External links
 "What is Popera?" by Oliver Kamm in Times Online, November 20, 2004, accessed April 23, 2020

Opera-related lists
Lists of musicians by genre
Lists of singers